Monica's Story is the authorized biography of Monica Lewinsky, written by Andrew Morton. Morton was also a biographer of Diana, Princess of Wales.

External links 
"'Monica's Story': Tawdry and Tiresome" by Michiko Kakutani in New York Times Book Review
Excerpts from the book

American biographies
Clinton–Lewinsky scandal
1999 non-fiction books